Siaogang is the southern terminus of the Red line of Kaohsiung MRT in Siaogang District, Kaohsiung, Taiwan.

Station overview
The station is a two-level underground station with an island platform and four exits. It is 215 metres long and is located at the intersection of Yanhai Rd. and Hanmin Rd. It is the southernmost metro station in Taiwan.

It is the terminus for the planned Linyuan Extension Line.

Around the Station
 China Steel
 Kaohsiung Municipal Social Education Hall
 Linhai Industrial Park
 National Kaohsiung University of Hospitality and Tourism
 Talin Power Plant
 Kaohsiung Municipal Siaogang Junior High School
 Kaohsiung Municipal Erming Elementary School

References

2008 establishments in Taiwan
Kaohsiung Metro Red line stations
Railway stations opened in 2008